Women & Songs: The 80s is a special album in the Women & Songs franchise.  It was released with Women & Songs: 60s Girl Groups one week before the official 6th album in the collection.

Overview 
The album includes 12 chart-toppers from the decade. The album begins with Flashdance from Irene Cara, and also includes Bananarama's Cruel Summer and Pat Benatar's We Belong.

Track listing 
 Flashdance (Irene Cara/K. Forsey/G. Moroder) [3:58]
(performed by Irene Cara)
 Gloria (Giancarlo Bigazzi/Umberto Tozzi/Trevor Veitch) [4:51]
(performed by Laura Branigan)
 Who's That Girl (Annie Lennox/Dave Stewart) [4:46]
(performed by Eurythmics)
 Bette Davis Eyes (Jackie DeShannon/Donna Weiss) [3:45]
(performed by Kim Carnes)
 Rise Up (Billy Bryans/Lynne Fernie/Lauri Conger/Lorraine Segato/Steve Webster) [3:44]
(performed by Parachute Club)
 Cruel Summer (Sarah Elizabeth Dallin/Siobhan Fahey/Steve Jolley/Tony Swain/Keren Woodward) [3:30]
(performed by Bananarama)
 We Belong (David Eric Lowen/Dan Navarro) [3:39]
(performed by Pat Benatar)
 Echo Beach (Mark Gane) [3:33]
(performed by Martha & The Muffins)
 Situation (Vince Clarke/Alison Moyet) [5:46]
(performed by Yazoo)
 The Glamorous Life (Sheila E.) [3:43]
(performed by Sheila E.)
 I Feel for You (Prince) [5:47]
(performed by Chaka Khan)
 Only in My Dreams (Debbie Gibson) [3:56]
(performed by Debbie Gibson)

References 
 [ Women & Songs: The 80s at AllMusic]

2002 compilation albums